The 2007–08 Austrian Hockey League season was the 78th season of the Austrian Hockey League, the top level of ice hockey in Austria. 10 teams participated in the league, and EC Red Bull Salzburg won the championship.

First round

Second round

Placing round

Qualification round

Playoffs

External links
Austrian Ice Hockey Association

Austrian Hockey League seasons
Aus
1
Aus
2007–08 in Hungarian ice hockey